David Eriale McArthur Jr. (November 18, 1904March 9, 1948) was a college and professional athlete in the United States.

Personal life
Born on November 18, 1904 in Cumberland Gap, Tennessee, son to David Eriale McArthur Sr., David Eriale McArthur Jr. grew up in Fountain City, Knoxville.  He became a Boy Scout, and graduated from Central High School, where he was the American football team captain.  McArthur graduated from the University of Tennessee (UT) in 1927.

By 1940, he worked with his brother at an automobile repair shop in Pass-a-Grille, St. Pete Beach, Florida.  On March 9, 1948, McArthur was found dead in a nearby building, having been shot in the head with a German pistol that was left nearby.

Football
McArthur graduated from the University of Tennessee (UT) in 1927. He played tackle for the Tennessee Volunteers' football program from 1925 through 1927. UT coach Robert Neyland called McArthur one of the best tackles he ever coached. McArthur was one of four Volunteers selected to All-Southern teams that year (joined by UT players guard John Barnhill, halfback Dick Dodson, and center Elvin Butcher). Combative with Dodson, the two faced off after their senior season in an amateur boxing match at Knoxville's Lyric Theater.

After college, McArthur played professional gridiron football for the Akron Pros, Ashland Armcos, Memphis Tigers, and Newark Tornadoes.

References

1904 births
1948 deaths
All-Southern college football players
American football tackles
deaths by firearm in Florida
Newark Tornadoes players
people from Pinellas County, Florida
Tennessee Volunteers football players